The Warner Theater is a historic Art Deco movie theater at 147 High Street in downtown Morgantown, West Virginia, United States. Opened June 12, 1931, it was designed by architect John Eberson, whose theaters included the since-demolished Colonial and Astor in Philadelphia, Pennsylvania, the Calvert in Washington, D.C., and the Capitol in Chicago, Illinois; and the extant Cinema le Grand Rex in Paris, France, the Capitol in Sydney, New South Wales, Australia, the Dixie in Staunton, Virginia, and the American in The Bronx, New York City. Built at a cost of $400,000, about $5 million today, it featured a 50-foot vertical marquee illuminated with over 6,000 light bulbs of different colors, though the vertical marquee has since been removed, and many of the original light bulbs on the rest of the marquee were replaced with neon strips.

The Round Table Corporation purchased the theater in 2004 with the intention of restoring it to its original condition, though the originally single-screen theater already became a multiplex in the early 1970s.

After 79 years of business, The Warner Theater closed on September 5, 2010.

Don Knotts worked at the Warner Theatre while he was a student at West Virginia University. On March 20, 1964, the Warner Theatre hosted the national premiere of The Incredible Mr. Limpet, a Live-action/animated film featuring actor Don Knotts.

On December 28, 2021, The Dominion Post published an article revealing that The Warner Theater had been purchased by Mark Downs and Rich Brant. The new owners plan to return the venue to a single-bay theater and use the theater to host live performances.

References

External links

Wolford, Michelle. "'American Chain Gang' premieres at Warner Theatre". The Dominion Post (Morgantown, West Virginia), Knight Ridder/Tribune Business News, 9 February 2006, p. 3
photo of Warner Theatre ca. 2000-2010

Theatres in West Virginia
Cinemas and movie theaters in West Virginia
Art Deco architecture in West Virginia
Buildings and structures in Morgantown, West Virginia
John Eberson buildings